Villiers Francis Hatton (20 August 1787 – 8 February 1859) was an Irish Whig politician.

He was a member of the United Service Club.

References

External links
 

UK MPs 1841–1847
Whig (British political party) MPs for Irish constituencies
1787 births
1859 deaths